Amata miozona is a moth of the family Erebidae. It was described by George Hampson in 1910. It is found in the Democratic Republic of the Congo, Tanzania, Zambia and Zimbabwe.

References

 

miozona
Moths described in 1910
Moths of Africa